Vicky Richardson is a writer, curator and consultant specialising in architecture and design. In 2014 she was nominated for Debrett's 500, as one of the 20 most influential people in British architecture; in 2015 she was named a 'Woman of the Year', and received an Honorary Fellowship from the Royal Institute of British Architects.

Biography 
Her writing is published in magazines and newspapers including the Evening Standard, Dezeen and Icon. She is a regular public speaker and convenor of events, including the symposium 'Rebuilding Aleppo: memory, loss and creation' at the Freud Museum in June 2018, and 'The Successful Architect?' at the Royal Academy in July 2018.

Richardson was Associate Director at the London School of Architecture from 2017 to 2018. During this crucial phase of the school's development, she established a public programme and curated the exhibition Idencity at the Roca London Gallery.

Richardson is best known for her work as Director of Architecture, Design and Fashion at the British Council, the UK's international organisation for educational opportunities and cultural relations from 2010 to 2016. An important part of this role was to act as Commissioner of the British Pavilion at Venice Architecture Biennale. Exhibitions during this period included Villa Frankenstein, curated by Muf architecture/art (2010); Venice Takeaway: Ideas to change British Architecture, co-curated by Richardson and Vanessa Norwood (2012); A Clockwork Jerusalem, curated by FAT and Crimson Architectural Historians (2014), and Home Economics, curated by Shumi Bose, Jack Self and Finn Williams (2016).

She studied architecture at the University of Westminster after a foundation degree in art at Central St Martins. She was deputy editor at the RIBA Journal before becoming editor of leading design magazine Blueprint, a role she held from 2004 to 2010.

Richardson is a member of the Advisory panel of the V&A Dundee. She was previously honorary treasurer of the Architectural Association, a co-director of the London Festival of Architecture and a member of the London Mayor's Cultural Strategy Group, which advised on the British capital's culture policy. She is regularly a member design juries including the RIBA Architecture Awards, the D&AD Awards and the Architect of the Year Awards.

She is a visiting critic at design and architecture schools, and writes about architecture and design for a variety of publications. While at the British Council, she established the design blog Back of the Envelope. Richardson's work on architecture, design and cities is widely published. Essays include "Queen Caroline's Temple and the Origins of Experimental Design in Kensington Gardens" in the Serpentine Pavilion catalogue (2016) and "Trade Show" for Faye Toogood at London Design Festival (2017). Books include New Vernacular Architecture (Laurence King, 2002) and In Defence of the Dome (ASI, 1999). In 2015, Richardson completed an MA in Early Modern History at King's College London. Her dissertation focused on the English publication and censorship of Common Sense, the first pamphlet by Thomas Paine, in 1776.

References

Living people
Alumni of King's College London
Year of birth missing (living people)
British women writers
British women curators
British architecture writers
British republicans
British women editors
British design
Architecture in the United Kingdom